Challenger High School is a public secondary school in Spanaway, Washington. The school serves grades 9-12 and graduates 100 to 130 students each year. To enroll, students must meet certain requirements, and unlike other high schools in the district, a normal school day at Challenger is 3 hours long. Students have 4 classes and are trusted to have done four hours of homework each night.

Challenger is a part of Bethel School District.

References

High schools in Pierce County, Washington
Public high schools in Washington (state)